Alycaulini is a tribe of gall midges, insects in the family Cecidomyiidae. There are about 20 genera and at least 200 described species in Alycaulini.

Genera
These genera belong to the tribe Alycaulini:

 Alycaulus Rübsaamen 1915a w (3 species)
 Asteromyia Felt, 1910 i c g b w (9 species)
 Astictoneura Gagne, 1969 i c g b w (1 species)
 Atolasioptera Möhn 1975 w (1 species)
 Baccharomyia Tavares 1917b w (5 species)
 Brachylasioptera Möhn 1964b w (2 species)
 Calamomyia i c g w (19 species)
 Chilophaga Gagne, 1969 i c g b w (5 species)
 Couridiplosis Maia 2004a w (1 species)
 Edestochilus i c g w (1 species)
 Edestosperma i c g w (1 species)
 Epilasioptera Möhn 1964b w (1 species)
 Geraldesia Tavares 1917b w (3 species)
 Lobolasioptera Möhn 1964b w (1 species)
 Marilasioptera Möhn 1975 w (1 species)
 Meunieriella Kieffer, 1909 i c g b w (21 species)
 Neolasioptera Felt, 1908 i c g b w (134 species)
 Protaplonyx i c g w (1 species)
 Smilasioptera Möhn 1975 w (1 species)
 Xipholasioptera Gagné 1995c w (1 species)

Data sources: i = ITIS, c = Catalogue of Life, g = GBIF, b = Bugguide.net w = Catalog of Cecidomyiidae of the World

References

Further reading

 
 
 
 
 

Cecidomyiinae
Articles created by Qbugbot
Nematocera tribes